Soul of the Game (also known as Field of Honour) is a 1996 television film about Negro league baseball.

The film stars Blair Underwood as Jackie Robinson, Delroy Lindo as Satchel Paige, Mykelti Williamson as Josh Gibson, and Harvey Williams as "Cat" Mays, the father of Willie Mays. The film depicts Paige and Gibson as the pitching and hitting stars, respectively, of the Negro leagues in the period immediately following World War II. Robinson is an up-and-coming player on Paige's team, the Kansas City Monarchs.

Premise
Branch Rickey, played by Edward Herrmann, is the general manager of the Brooklyn Dodgers who is determined to integrate Major League Baseball. He begins sending his scouts to Negro league games to find the best players. Rickey directs his scouts to look not only at playing ability but also at the players' maturity and capacity to withstand the hostility that is sure to be directed

Cast

Main
 Delroy Lindo as Satchel Paige
 Mykelti Williamson as Josh Gibson
 Edward Herrmann as Branch Rickey
 Blair Underwood as Jackie Robinson
 R. Lee Ermey as Wilkie
 Salli Richardson-Whitfield as Lahoma (credited as Salli Richardson)
 Gina Ravera as Grace
 Obba Babatundé as Cum Posey
 Cylk Cozart as Zo Perry
 J.D. Hall as Gus Greenlee
 Jerry Hardin as Happy Chandler
 Brent Jennings as Frank Duncan
 Richard Riehle as Pete Harmon
 Armand Asselin as Rip
 Joey Banks as Link Rudolph

Supporting
 Paul Bates as Orderly #1
 Bruce Beatty as Reporter
 Guy Boyd as Clark Griffith
 Stacye P. Branche as Ella Fitzgerald
 Gregg Burge as Bill Robinson
 Ed Cambridge as Bellhop
 Mimi Cozzens as Jane Rickey
 Daniel Estrin as Paperboy
 Zaid Farid as Clerk
 Edith Fields as Nurse
 Erika Flores as Girl
 Holiday Freeman as Lillian the Secretary
 Jesse D. Goins as John Givens Reporter
 Tracy Holliway as Marian Anderson
 David Johnson as Roy Campanella
 Johnny G. Jones as Hotel Manager
 Jonathon Lamer as Cardinal
 Joseph Latimore as Jesse Williams
 William Bruce Lukens as Umpire #3
 Bob Minor as Goon #2
 Edwin 'EdVanz'd' Morrow as Young Willie Mays (credited as Edwin Morrow)
 Jon Pennell as Steve Buckley
 Alex Rascovar as Boy
 Lou Richards as Baseball Announcer
 Terrence Riggins as Orderly #2
 Joe Rodriguez as Dodger
 Al Rossi as Mayor LaGuardia
 Kevin Sifuentes as Waiter
 Tim Snay as Umpire #1
 Charles C. Stevenson as Supervisor
 Darnell Suttles as Goon #1
 Arthur Tipp as Umpire (Home Plate)
 Isaiah Washington as Adult Willie Mays
 Harvey Williams as Cat Mays
 Oscar Williams as Grays Manager

Cameo appearance
 Sean Blakemore as Grace's husband
 Jeff Coopwood as Stadium Announcer
 Jimmy Ortega as El Gigante (Cuban baseball player)

Reception
Review aggregator Rotten Tomatoes gives the film a 67% rating based on 6 reviews. Audiences gave the film a 67% rating based on 114 reviews.

References

External links

 

1996 television films
1996 drama films
1996 films
1990s sports films
American baseball films
HBO Films films
Sports films based on actual events
American drama films
Films set in Indiana
Films set in the 1940s
Films shot in Indiana
Cultural depictions of Jackie Robinson
Cultural depictions of baseball players
Films directed by Kevin Rodney Sullivan
African-American biographical dramas
1990s English-language films
1990s American films